Alphonse Le Roy (1822–1896) was a professor at the University of Liège, in Belgium, who contributed over 150 entries to the Biographie Nationale de Belgique.

Life

Le Roy was born in Liège on 28 July 1822, the only son of Louis-Nicolas Le Roy and Henriette Streel. He studied philosophy at Liège University, graduating at the age of 19, and after abandoning a law degree went on to qualify as a teacher. He taught at a secondary school in Tienen for a number of years from 1844, helping set up the Journal de l'Instruction publique in 1845. On 12 September 1848 he married Marie-Françoise Elisa Delvaux (1818–1902). In 1850 he was appointed lecturer on logic and metaphysics at the University of Liège. He went on to lecture on archaeology (1853–1855; 1865–1875), aesthetics (1854–1879) and the history of philosophy (1874–1889). He was appointed extraordinary professor in 1856, full professor in 1862, and professor emeritus on 23 September 1889.

He was elected a corresponding member of the Royal Academy of Science, Letters and Fine Arts of Belgium on 9 May 1870, a full member on 12 May 1873, and president in 1882. He was a member of many other scholarly societies. He died in Liège on 2 March 1896.

Works
 La philosophie au pays de Liège, XVIIe et XVIIIe siècles (Liège, Paris and Leipzig, 1860)
 Liber Memorialis: L'Université de Liège depuis sa fondation (Liège, 1869)

References

1822 births
1896 deaths
Academic staff of the University of Liège
Members of the Royal Academy of Belgium